Wombourne High School (formerly Ounsdale High School) is a coeducational secondary school and sixth form located in Wombourne, Staffordshire, England.  It is situated on Ounsdale Road in the west of the village, and stands on an adjacent site to the local leisure centre. It also has an Invictus sixth form base campus on site for 16- to 19-year-olds, which has a built 6th form centre detachment which was opened by the pop star Beverley Knight. The schools is currently undergoing building, this includes; New window fixtures, A secondary entrance to the reception area with a disabled ramp and stairs.

The school has approximately 1,200 pupils and provides education at Key Stage 3, GCSE and sixth form. Its current head teacher is Dr. Gemma Smith who took over this position in September 2018 after Ms. Christine Brown. But it is said that Dr. Gemma Smith will be leaving soon and a new headteacher will be taking her place. Wombourne High School is a part of the Invictus Education Trust, which includes the following schools: Ellowes Hall and College, Wombourne High School, Kinver High School, Crestwood High School, Leasowes High School, Pedmore High School, and Rufford Primary School.

76% of the school's GCSE students gained 5 or more A*–C grades in 2010.

History
The school opened in September 1956 as a secondary school with a GCE stream. It stood in eighteen acres of playing fields in a rural area five miles south west of Wolverhampton. The first stage of the building works was finished in 1957.

As the school building programme progressed the three form entry was increased to four in 1957 and five in 1958, at which time the school became fully comprehensive with a non—selected intake. Ounsdale attracted children of all abilities from its catchment area from Pattingham and Patshull in the north to Enville in the south. It provided all secondary level education, grammar, technical and modern, without any clearly defined streaming of individual pupils.

The second stage of building works was completed by September 1960.  The school then consisted of three blocks; an administrative block with offices, dining hall, assembly hall, library, gymnasium, indoor heated swimming pool and changing rooms; a three-storey block of 22 classrooms (including specialist rooms for history, geography and music); and a practical block consisting of laboratories for general science, physics, chemistry and biology along with rooms for arts, crafts, needlecraft, domestic science, woodwork, technical drawing and metalwork. Outside were six hard tennis courts, and a school garden with greenhouse, tool shed and potting shed. There were playing fields and hard areas which could be configured for various outdoor sports.

The first headmaster was Harold Holyrde, MA. He retired in March 1975.

Anwar Shemza, the Pakistani artist, worked as a teacher at Ounsdale between 1962 and 1979.

In September 2002, the school was granted specialist school status as an Arts College. This has led to the addition of a slightly modified school motto: Pursuing excellence by developing the creativity of learners through and in the arts.

In March 2015 the school converted to academy status.

In 2019 the school has changed it name from Ounsdale High School to Wombourne High School.

Notable former pupils 
 Christopher Pincher, Conservative MP since 2010 for Tamworth
 Helene Hewitt (née Banks), climate scientist
 Wendy Sadler, science communicator
 Lydia Thompson, rugby union player
 Prof. Sarah Spurgeon OBE FREng FIET, Professor of Control Engineering since 2016 at University College London and from 2008 to 2016 at the University of Kent, Professor of Engineering from 2002 to 2008 at the University of Leicester, President from 2014 to 2017 of the Institute of Measurement and Control

References

External links
 

Secondary schools in Staffordshire
Academies in Staffordshire
Wombourne